The 1995 Limerick Senior Hurling Championship was the 101st staging of the Limerick Senior Hurling Championship since its establishment by the Limerick County Board.

Kilmallock were the defending champions.

On 24 September 1995, Patrickswell won the championship after a 2-19 to 0-08 defeat of Ballybrown in the final. It was their 14th championship title overall and their first title in two championship seasons.

Results

Final

Championship statistics

Miscellaneous
 Na Piarsaigh make their first appearance at senior level.

References

Limerick Senior Hurling Championship
Limerick Senior Hurling Championship